Allison Jones may refer to:

Allison Jones (casting director) (born 1955), American film casting director
Allison Jones (athlete) (born 1984), American Paralympic skier and cyclist
Allison Jones (actress), American actress in Nightjohn

See also
Alyson Jones (born 1956), GP and swimmer
Alison Jones, New Zealand sociologist